The Regener barrel was the name of a scientific payload for the World War II V-2 rocket.

Mid-1942 plans for subsequent launches to study upper-atmospheric guidance and science were not carried out due to the need for test launches and the eventual advance of the Russian armies.

Instrumentation had been contracted on July 11, 1942; and the Research Foundation for the Physics of the Stratosphere was to develop the "Regener barrel" with a quartz barograph, a recording thermometer, an ultraviolet spectrograph, and an air sampler.

By January 18, 1945, rumors of nearby Soviet tanks resulted in Erich Regener's organization being sent from Peenemünde before the A-4 instrument package had been finished. The Regener-Tonne parachute was tested at Test Stand VII of the Peenemünde Army Research Center and a mock-up was launched in January 1945.

References

World War II guided missiles of Germany